There are two species of snake named Yunnan keelback:

  Hebius parallelus, endemic to Asia
  Hebius clerki, found in India, Myanmar, China, and Nepal